Krapje may refer to:

 Krapje, Slovenia, a village near Ljutomer
 Krapje, Croatia, a village near Jasenovac